Ketotifen, sold under the brand name Zaditor among others, is a second-generation noncompetitive H1-antihistamine and mast cell stabilizer. It is most commonly sold as a salt with fumaric acid, ketotifen fumarate, and is available in two forms. In its ophthalmic form, it is used to treat allergic conjunctivitis. In its oral form, it is used to prevent asthma attacks or anaphylaxis, as well as various mast cell, allergic-type disorders.

It was patented in 1970 and came into medical use in 1976. In 2020, it was the 289th most commonly prescribed medication in the United States, with more than 1million prescriptions.

Medical uses
Ketotifen relieves and prevents eye itchiness and/or irritation associated with most seasonal allergies. It starts working within minutes after administering the drops. The drug has not been studied in children under three. The mean elimination half life is 12 hours. Besides its anti-histaminic activity, it is also a functional leukotriene antagonist and a phosphodiesterase inhibitor.

"[O]ral ketotifen has been used in patients with asthma, allergic rhinitis, allergic conjunctivitis, atopic dermatitis, chronic urticaria, cold-induced urticaria, cholinergic urticaria, exercise-induced urticaria, [systemic mast cell disease including mastocytosis, Mast Cell Activation Syndrome (MCAS), allergic and nonallergic anaphylaxis, angioedema], and food allergy in Canada, Europe, and Mexico." Now available via prescription at US compounding pharmacies: "For adults and older children with asthma or allergic disease, the recommended dose of ketotifen is 1 mg twice daily." "FDA staff did recommend more extensive evaluations for management of urticaria."

The drug may also help relieve irritable bowel syndrome.

Side effects
Side effects of systemic (oral) use include drowsiness, weight gain, dry mouth, irritability, and increased nosebleeds.

Pharmacology
Ketotifen is a selective antihistamine – that is, an inverse agonist of the histamine H1 receptor (Ki = 0.166 nM) – and mast cell stabilizer. In addition, ketotifen has weak anticholinergic (Ki = 204 nM for ) and antiserotonergic (Ki = 38.9 nM for 5-HT2A) activity. However, at the dosages in which it is typically used clinically, both the anticholinergic and antiserotonergic activity of ketotifen are said not to be appreciable.

Society and culture

Brand names
Ketotifen is marketed under many brand names worldwide.

References

External links 
 

Benzocycloheptathiophenes
H1 receptor antagonists
Mast cell stabilizers
Novartis brands
Piperidines
Serotonin receptor antagonists